Michael Hickins (born May 1, 1961) is an American fiction writer, journalist, and news editor. He works at Oracle Corp. as director of strategic communications, and used to be as an editor at the Wall Street Journal and founding editor of CIO Journal. His debut work, The Actual Adventures of Michael Missing, was published in 1991 and featured a cover design by Chip Kidd. Kirkus Reviews called the anthology "a strange collection" and "a weird and unconvincing debut." Hickins has been a speaker and panelist at the MIT Sloan CIO Symposium in 2013 and 2014.

Bibliography
 The Actual Adventures of Michael Missing (1991)  
 Blomqvist (1996) 
 Lion Heartbreak (1998)
 The Silk Factory. Finding Threads of My Family's True Holocaust Story (June 2023)

References

External links
 

20th-century American novelists
American male journalists
Journalists from New York City
American male novelists
Minimalist writers
Writers from New York City
1961 births
Living people
American male short story writers
20th-century American short story writers
20th-century American male writers
Novelists from New York (state)
20th-century American non-fiction writers